Chernavka is a rural locality (a selo) in Orekhovsky Selsoviet, Burlinsky District, Altai Krai, Russia. The population was 123 as of 2013. It was founded in 1912. There are 2 streets.

Geography 
Chernavka is located 33 km southwest of Burla (the district's administrative centre) by road. Orekhovo and Tsvetopol are the nearest rural localities.

References 

Rural localities in Burlinsky District